Əmir (also, Emir) is a village in the Gadabay Rayon of Azerbaijan.  The village forms part of the municipality of Poladlı.

References 

 

Populated places in Gadabay District